Otidea is a genus of fungi in the family Pyronemataceae. The genus is widely distributed in northern temperate regions.

Taxonomy
The genus, proposed in 1851 by German physician and mycologist Hermann Friedrich Bonorden, was based on Christiaan Hendrik Persoon's 1822 Peziza Otidea. Otidea is probably derived from the Greek words οϋς (ous), gen. ώτός (otos), meaning "ear", referring to the fruitbody shape of some species.

Selected species
, Index Fungorum lists 46 valid species of Otidea:
Otidea alba Velen. 1934
Otidea alutacea  (Pers.) Massee 1895
Otidea angusta Harmaja 2009
Otidea apophysata (Cooke & W.Phillips) Sacc. 1889
Otidea bicolor W.Y.Zhuang & Zhu L.Yang 2010 – China
Otidea bufonia (Pers.) Boud. 1907
Otidea caeruleopruinosa Harmaja 2009
Otidea cinerascens Velen. 1947
Otidea cochleata (L.) Fuckel 1870
Otidea crassa W.Y.Zhuang 2006 – China
Otidea daliensis W.Y.Zhuang & Korf 1989 – China
Otidea flavidobrunneola Harmaja 2009
Otidea formicarum Harmaja 1976
Otidea fuckelii M.Carbone & Van Vooren 2010
Otidea grandis (Pers.) Rehm 1893
Otidea harperiana Rehm 1904
Otidea indivisa Velen. 1934
Otidea kauffmanii Kanouse 1950
Otidea kunmingensis W.Y.Zhuang 2008
Otidea lactea J.Z.Cao & L.Fan 1990
Otidea leporina (Batsch) Fuckel 1870
Otidea lilacina R.Heim & L.Remy 1932
Otidea lobata Rodway 1925 – Australia
Otidea microspora (Kanouse) Harmaja 1976
Otidea mirabilis Bolognini & Jamoni 2001
Otidea myosotis Harmaja 1976
Otidea nannfeldtii Harmaja 1976
Otidea ochracea (Fr.) Seaver 1904
Otidea olivaceobrunnea Harmaja 2009
Otidea onotica (Pers.) Fuckel 1870
Otidea papillata Harmaja 1976
Otidea pedunculata Velen. 1934
Otidea platyspora  Nannf. 1966
Otidea propinquata (P.Karst.) Harmaja 1976
Otidea purpurea (M.Zang) Korf & W.Y.Zhuang 1985
Otidea pusilla Rahm 1958
Otidea rainierensis Kanouse 1950
Otidea reisneri Velen. 1922
Otidea sinensis J.Z.Cao & L.Fan 1990 – China
Otidea smithii Kanouse 1939
Otidea subpurpurea W.Y.Zhuang 2008
Otidea subterranea
Otidea tasmanica Rodway 1925 – Australia
Otidea tianshuiensis J.Z.Cao, L.Fan & B.Liu 1990
Otidea tuomikoskii Harmaja 1976
Otidea violacea A.L.Sm. & Ramsb. 1916
Otidea yunnanensis (B.Liu & J.Z.Cao) W.Y.Zhuang & C.Y.Liu 2006

References

External links

Pezizales genera
Pyronemataceae